The Institute of Aeronautics and Space (Portuguese: Instituto de Aeronáutica e Espaço) is a military research organization of the Brazilian Air Force's Department of Aerospace Science and Technology (DCTA), founded on 1 January 1954.

The IAE was refounded in 1991 as result of the merger of the Brazil's Institute of Space Activities and the Institute of Development and Research subordinated to the DCTA. The current IAE have a strong presence in the space and aeronautics activities in Brazil.

Together with the National Institute for Space Research (INPE), the Alcântara Space Center (CEA) and the Barreira do Inferno Launch Center (CLBI), these public organizations represent today the pillars for the national space program through the Brazilian Space Agency (AEB).

The IAE is responsible for the development of rockets and launchers such as the VLM-1 for AEB, the VSB-30 and 14-X for the Brazilian Air Force, satellites and the corresponding ground stations for the CEA, among others tasks.

Developments
The list of rockets and launchers developed by the IAE:
 VLS
 Sonda I
 Sonda II
 Sonda III
 Sonda IV
 VS-30
 VS-40
 VSB-30 
 VLM-1
 14-X

See also
 Brazilian Organization for the Development of Aeronautical Certification
 Brazilian Space Agency
 Brazilian space program
 Instituto Tecnológico de Aeronáutica

References

External links 
 CTA homepage
 IFI homepage

Aerospace
Brazilian Air Force
Commands of the Brazilian Armed Forces
Research institutes in Brazil
Organisations based in São José dos Campos